Fort Vijfhuizen is one of forty-two forts in the Defense Line of Amsterdam (Dutch: stelling van Amsterdam), a World Heritage Site. It is located in the town of Vijfhuizen on the ringvaart which surrounds the Haarlemmermeer polder. The main fort is currently maintained by a charitable foundation called Kunstfort Vijfhuizen which leases space for twelve artist studios and a restaurant.

The fort is situated on a hill surrounded by a moat and accessible during opening hours. It was built in 1889 and 1890 with sand taken from the excavations for a new sluice-gate complex in IJmuiden. On 3 May 1943 an American Ventura bomber crashed into the moat.

South of this fort, also along the ringvaart, is the first fore position of the fort, currently part of a golf course. A bit further south is yet another fore position at fort Cruquius, just south of the Cruquius Museum.

References

External links

Vijfhuizen
Rijksmonuments in Haarlemmermeer
Tourist attractions in North Holland
Vijfhuizen